Vice-Admiral John Baker (1660 – 10 November 1716) was an officer of the Royal Navy and politician who sat in the House of Commons between 1713 and 1716. He rose to the rank of vice-admiral after service in the Nine Years' War and the War of the Spanish Succession.

Biography

Baker returned to England with the squadron of which so many of the ships were lost in the Scilly naval disaster on 22 October 1707, resulting in the deaths of nearly 2,000 men and Admiral Sir Cloudesley Shovell, and, having arrived at the Nore, was ordered to refit and keep the men on board with a view to their being sent to other ships. Baker remonstrated; he thought their case was hard, and that they ought to be allowed to go home. 'Most of them,' he wrote, on 3 November, 'have been with me in this ship for almost six years, and many have followed me from ship to ship for several years before.' It does not appear that any good came of the application, which the Admiralty probably considered a bit of maudlin and absurd sentimentality.

On 26 January 1708 Baker was promoted to be rear-admiral of the white, and commanded in the second post under Sir George Byng on the coast of Scotland. He afterwards conducted Maria Anna of Austria, the daughter of Leopold I, Holy Roman Emperor, who was betrothed to John V of Portugal, from Holland to Spithead, and with Sir George Byng escorted her to Lisbon.

Towards the end of 1711 Baker was detached by Jennings to Lisbon and the Azores, to protect the Portuguese, East India, and Brazil trade, especially from René Duguay-Trouin and Jacques Cassard. In the course of a cruise from Lisbon in February 1712 he drove a large Spanish ship ashore near Cape St. Mary's, but the weather was rough, and before he could approach, the wreck was gutted and destroyed by the Portuguese. Afterwards he captured a richly laden French ship for Martinique, and returned to Lisbon by the beginning of March. At the Azores he remained till the following September, and having intelligence that the Brazil fleet was near, he put to sea on the 11th, and escorted it to the Tagus.

Baker returned to England at the peace, and was elected MP for Weymouth and Melcombe Regis at the 1713 general election but was unseated on petition on 3 June 1714. He was re-elected at the 1715 general election but died the following year. He followed his patron Byng in parliamentary matters and therefore supported the whigs and the Admiralty administration of Edward Russell, 1st Earl of Orford.

Soon after the accession of George I in August 1714, Baker was again sent out as commander-in-chief Mediterranean Fleet to negotiate with or restrain the corsairs of North Africa, He concluded a treaty with Tripoli and Tunis, and inflicted punishment on some of the Sallee cruisers. He had just been relieved by Rear-Admiral Charles Cornewall, when he died at Port Mahon on 10 November 1716.

Baker was buried in Westminster Abbey, where a monument to his memory by Francis Bird was erected, for, though his is not one of the great historic names of the navy, he was, in the words of his epitaph, 'a brave, judicious, and experienced officer, a sincere friend, and a true lover of his country.' His nephew, Hercules Baker, a captain in the navy, and who was serving in the Mediterranean at the time of the vice-admiral's death, became, in 1736, treasurer of Greenwich Hospital, and held that office till his death in 1744.

References

Attribution

1660 births
1716 deaths
Royal Navy vice admirals
17th-century Royal Navy personnel
18th-century Royal Navy personnel
British military personnel of the Nine Years' War
British military personnel of the War of the Spanish Succession
Members of the Parliament of Great Britain for English constituencies
British MPs 1713–1715
British MPs 1715–1722
Burials at Westminster Abbey
Whig (British political party) MPs for English constituencies